The British Homing World (BHW) is a pigeon racing weekly magazine.

History and profile
BHW was founded in 1933. The magazine is a publication of the Royal Pigeon Racing Association, and has a circulation of around 20,000 copies per week. In 2010 its circulation was 24,000 copies.

References

Sports magazines published in the United Kingdom
Weekly magazines published in the United Kingdom
Domestic pigeons
Magazines established in 1933
Pigeon racing
1933 establishments in the United Kingdom